The Narrow Road to the Deep North is the sixth novel by Richard Flanagan, and was the winner of the 2014 Booker Prize.  

The novel tells the story of an Australian doctor haunted by memories of a love affair with his uncle's wife and of his subsequent experiences as a Far East prisoner of war during the construction of the Burma Railway. Decades later, he finds his growing celebrity at odds with his feelings of failure and guilt.

The title is taken from the 17th century epic Oku no Hosomichi, the travel diary and magnum opus of Japanese poet Matsuo Bashō.

Plot summary 
Dorrigo Evans has found fame and public recognition as a war veteran in old age, but inwardly he is plagued by his own shortcomings and considers his numerous accolades to be a “failure of perception on the part of others”. He knows that his colleagues consider him a reckless and dangerous surgeon, and he has habitually cheated on his faithful and adoring wife, though his public reputation has been undented by the air of scandal that trails him in his private life.

Flashbacks describe Dorrigo’s early life in rural Tasmania, and his love affair with Amy Mulvaney, the young wife of his uncle and the love of his life. Dorrigo meets Amy by chance in an Adelaide bookstore and he finds that "her body was a poem beyond memorising". Despite the fact that she is married to his uncle, Dorrigo felt the affair was justified because "the war pressed, the war deranged, the war undid, the war excused". In a metaphor for the novel's theme of fatalism, Amy observes while swimming a group of fish trying "to escape the breaking wave’s hold. And all the time the wave had them in its power and would take them where it would, and there was nothing that the glistening chain of fish could do to change their fate."  

After the end of the affair, he joins the Australian Imperial Force. His regiment is captured during the Battle of Java and is sent to labour on the notorious Burma Death Railway. One out of every three workers engaged on the Burma Death Railroad died during its construction. During the construction of the railroad, he is reluctantly bestowed the leadership over his fellow prisoners and fights a losing battle to protect his charges against disease, malnutrition and the violence of their captors. Dorrigo sadly observes as the bodies of his fellow POWs break down and disintegrate with "eyes that already seemed to be little more than black-shadowed sockets waiting for worms". The camp's commander, Major Nakamura, a methamphetamine addict who pushes his prisoners harder and harder out of the fear of failing the Emperor, is in his own way just as much a prisoner of the railroad project as the men he brutalises.

A major theme of the novel concerns the Australian value of "mateship" -- a sense of camaraderie and loyalty -- or the absence of "mateship" on the Burma Death Railroad. Among the POWs is the energetic and hardworking Tiny Middleton who wants "to show them little yellow bastards what a white man is" by overfilling his work quotas, thereby inspiring the Japanese to set higher work quotas that lead to the deaths of the weaker POWs. Other POWs include the artistic Rabbit Hendricks who secretly makes drawings of camp life, the white supremacist Rooster MacNeice who has trouble accepting he is now a prisoner of the Japanese, and the defiant Darky Gardiner who is repeatedly beaten by the guards and finally drowns himself in a latrine full of excrement rather than endure another beating.   

After the war, the fates of the prisoners and captors are shown. The "Goanna", a Korean man renowned for his brutality in the prison camp who was himself forced into the Japanese army, is hanged for his crimes. His superior officer, Major Nakamura, returns to Tokyo and avoids capture as a war criminal by hiding among the ruins of Shinjuku. After a conversation with a Japanese doctor who served with Unit 731 in Manchukuo reveals to him the country’s human experimentation program during the war, he gradually absolves himself of any sense of guilt for his actions. Other Australian soldiers imprisoned with Dorrigo live through the trauma of their experience as prisoners. Dorrigo’s own acts of heroism, and the reverence of his fellow soldiers, fail to assuage his sense of shame and self-loathing. Dorrigo comes to "feel the more people I am with...the more alone I feel".

Background
Flanagan wrote that his father's experience as a Japanese prisoner of war influenced him to write the book. The character of Evans was also partially based on the Australian hero Edward “Weary” Dunlop, an Australian Army doctor who struggled despite overwhelming odds to care for the men who suffered and died during the construction of the Burma Death Railroad. Like Dorrigo, Dunlop bargained with the Japanese officers in attempts to improve conditions for the "living skeletons" that were his fellow POWs. And like Dorrigo, Dunlop found that many of the Japanese and Korean guards were sadists who thoroughly enjoyed inflicting misery on others.

Reception 
The novel was critically acclaimed both in Australia and internationally on its release, with Man Booker judge chair AC Grayling  praising it as a "remarkable love story as well as a story about human suffering and comradeship". It was shortlisted for the 2014 Miles Franklin Award. 

The Australian critic Daniel Herborn praised the book, writing, "A story that is both harrowing and deeply humanist, The Narrow Road to the Deep North has been billed as Flanagan's most personal work, inspired by his father's stories of his POW experience. It is also perhaps his most ambitious, a deeply felt attempt to come to terms with the almost unimaginable horror of the Death Railway." The Australian novelist Thomas Keneally wrote the book was "..a grand examination of what it is to be a good man and a bad man in the one flesh and, above all, of how hard it is to live after survival". 

Writing in Literary Review, A. S. H. Smyth praised Flanagan for his "poet's appreciation of unsentimental detail," which serves less to embellish memory than to clarify it, bestowing "the quiet blessing of veracity on episodes perhaps otherwise too outlandish or too harrowing to be thought real."

References

2013 Australian novels
Australian historical novels
Novels by Richard Flanagan
Booker Prize-winning works
Novels set during World War II
Novels about prisoners of war
Alfred A. Knopf books